Allergen immunotherapy, also known as desensitization or hypo-sensitization, is a medical treatment for environmental allergies, such as insect bites, and asthma. Immunotherapy involves exposing people to larger and larger amounts of allergen in an attempt to change the immune system's response.

Meta-analyses have found that injections of allergens under the skin are effective in the treatment in allergic rhinitis in children and in asthma. The benefits may last for years after treatment is stopped. It is generally safe and effective for allergic rhinitis, allergic conjunctivitis, allergic forms of asthma, and stinging insects. The evidence also supports the use of sublingual immunotherapy against rhinitis and asthma, but it is less strong. In this form the allergen is given under the tongue and people often prefer it to injections. Immunotherapy is not recommended as a stand-alone treatment for asthma.

Side effects during sublingual immunotherapy treatment are usually local and mild and can often be eliminated by adjusting the dosage. Anaphylaxis during sublingual immunotherapy treatment has occurred on rare occasions.

Potential side effects related to subcutaneous immunotherapy treatment for asthma and allergic rhinoconjunctivitis include mild or moderate skin or respiratory reactions. Severe side effects such as anaphylaxis during subcutaneous immunotherapy treatment are relatively uncommon.

Discovered by Leonard Noon and John Freeman in 1911, allergen immunotherapy is the only medicine known to tackle not only the symptoms but also the causes of respiratory allergies. A detailed diagnosis is necessary to identify the allergens involved.

Types

Subcutaneous 
Subcutaneous immunotherapy (SCIT), also known as allergy shots, is the historical route of administration and consists of injections of allergen extract, which must be performed by a medical professional. Subcutaneous immunotherapy protocols generally involve weekly injections during a build-up phase, followed by monthly a maintenance phase that consists of injections for a period of 3–5 years. The build-up phase involves the patient being administered injections which contain increasing amounts of allergens about one to two times per week. The length of the build-up phase is dependent upon how often injections are administered, but normally ranges from three to six months. After the effective dose is reached, the maintenance phase is implemented, which varies depending upon an individual's response to the build-up phase.

When accounting for a person's age, type of allergen, and severity of allergy, there is a high probability that subcutaneous allergen immunotherapy may provide greater clinical and immunological responses than sublingual allergen immunotherapy. Compared to sublingual allergen immunotherapy, there are no significant differences observed in quality of life.

It is possible, but rare (1/2.5 million), that people undergoing subcutaneous allergen immunotherapy may experience a fatal anaphylactic event. Subcutaneous allergen immunotherapy adverse events vary significantly depending on different allergenic extracts and the application of different allergen immunotherapy schedules.

Allergen immunotherapy schedules include the "cluster" approach, which involves administering several doses sequentially in a single day; a "conventional" approach, which involves incrementally increasing the dose over approximately 15 weeks; and the "rush" approach, which involves administering incremental doses at intervals of 15–60 minutes over 1–3 days).

It is challenging to perform an adequate risk assessment on the use of subcutaneous allergen immunotherapy compared to other forms of allergen immunotherapy administration due to the variability of immunotherapy schedules and further research is required.

Sublingual
Sublingual immunotherapy involves putting drops or a tablet of allergen extracts under the tongue, which are then absorbed through the lining of the mouth. Sublingual immunotherapy has been demonstrated to be effective against rhinoconjunctivitis and asthma symptoms. This effectiveness, however, varies depending on the type of allergen. The strongest evidence for the efficacy of sublingual immunotherapy comes from studies that used grass allergens or mite allergens to alleviate allergic rhinitis symptoms; the evidence shows modest improvement.

Sublingual immunotherapy is used to treat allergic rhinitis, often from seasonal allergies, and is typically given in several doses over a 12-week period. It works best when given 12 weeks before the start of the pollen season. The first dose is given by a physician to monitor for any rare reactions or anaphylaxis. Subsequent doses can be taken at home which makes this a convenient alternative to subcutaneous immunotherapy.

While a number of side effects have been associated with sublingual immunotherapy, serious adverse effects are very rare (about 1.4/100000 doses), and there has not been a reported fatality. There have been a small number of reports of anaphylaxis. The majority of side effects are 'local' and usually resolve within a few days. They include swelling of the mouth, tongue or lip, throat irritation, nausea, abdominal pain, vomiting, diarrhea, heartburn, and uvular edema. It is not yet clear if there are any risk factors that might increase a person's susceptibility to these adverse effects. Sublingual immunotherapy appears to be better tolerated than subcutaneous immunotherapy and causes fewer side effects. The safety of sublingual immunotherapy has not been studied extensively in people with chronic immunodeficiency or autoimmune disorders.

Oral
Oral immunotherapy (OIT) involves feeding an allergic individual increasing amounts of a food allergen in order to raise the threshold which triggers a reaction. Long-term, many study participants still experienced mild allergic reactions or needed to regularly consume the allergen to maintain desensitivity. Additionally, oral immunotherapy is known to have an increased risk in the probability of needing epinephrine in patients who take it. Currently in the U.S., the U.S. Food and Drug Administration has not approved any oral immunotherapy agents for asthma.

Transdermal
Transdermal immunotherapy (TDIT) involves skin-induced suppression via epicutaneous (EC) application of an antigen in order to raise the threshold which triggers a reaction.

Mechanism of action
In desensitization immunotherapy the aim is to induce or restore tolerance to the allergen by reducing its tendency to induce IgE production. People are desensitized through the administration of escalating doses of allergen that gradually decreases the IgE-dominated response. The objective of immunotherapy is to direct the immune response away from humoral immunity and toward cellular immunity, thereby encouraging the body to produce fewer IgE antibodies and more CD4+ T regulatory cells that secrete IL-10 and TGF-β, which skews the response away from IgE production.

Oral immunotherapy also creates an increase in allergen-specific IgG4 antibodies and a decrease in allergen-specific IgE antibodies, as well as diminished mast cells and basophils, two cell types that are large contributors to allergic reaction.

Protocol
Reactivity is tested using oral food challenges or with skin prick tests. Phases 1 & 2 of sublingual immunotherapy are conducted in a supervised clinical setting. However, phase 3 can be done at home.

History
In the late 19th century and early 20th century, allergic conditions were increasingly attracting both medical attention (as an emerging public health problem) and scientific interest (aided by progress in biochemical techniques and the development of molecular and pathogenic theories). However, the many and varied treatment approaches were very unscientific.

The British physicians Noon and Freeman were the first researchers to test pollen allergen immunotherapy in humans. Noon and Freeman, researchers at the Department of Therapeutic Inoculation at St. Mary's Hospital in London, published their findings in The Lancet in 1911. Building on the observations of his predecessors Bostock, Blackley and Dunbar, Noon noted that people with hay fever "sometimes become cured" and that this was possibly because they "have had the good fortune to develop an active immunity against the toxin." He hypothesized that by injecting people with hay fever with small amounts of a pollen "toxin", a state of immunity could be achieved.

Allergen immunotherapy was part of mainstream medical practice for hay fever treatment in the 1930s.

Society and culture
Sublingual immunotherapy drops are currently commercialized and used in most European and South American countries, and in Australia and Asian countries. In most European countries, national regulations allow marketing of allergen products as "named patient preparations" (NPPs). In the United States, drop formulations have not yet received FDA approval, though off-label prescription is becoming common. In 2014, the FDA approved a once-daily sublingual tablet containing allergen extracts for the treatment of "hay fever" (allergic rhinitis with or without conjunctivitis).

Recognition by international agencies 
The use of subcutaneous immunotherapy for treatment of environmental-based allergies and asthma is well supported by the majority of national and international allergy groups such as the World Allergy Organization, Canadian Society of Allergy and Immunology, European Academy of Allergy and Clinical Immunology, and the American Academy of Allergy, Asthma and Immunology. The use of sublingual immunotherapy is supported by few allergy agencies in order to allow for more investigation to occur on its practical use. Oral immunotherapy is generally not recommended, however the EAACI recommends that this treatment only be administered at specialized centres with expert professionals.

Subcutaneous immunotherapy is both approved and regulated by the American Food and Drug Administration (FDA) and the European Medicinal Agency (EMEA). The FDA currently allows individual allergists to create the formula for each dosage, whereas the EMEA requires treatment extracts to be prepared at manufacturing sites. The FDA has approved sublingual therapy through the use of tablets, but has not approved specific formulation. The EMEA has also approved sublingual therapy through both tablets and solution, and this administration now accounts for 45% of immunotherapy treatments.

The FDA advisory board has supported the use of AR101, an oral immunotherapy, for patients with peanut allergies in 2019.

Science communication 
Allergen immunotherapy is viewed as a beneficial way to curb allergies in the perspective of the media. It is seen where it can be covered by insurance and offer a more permanent solution than antihistamines or nasal steroids that treat symptoms, not the body's reaction. Communication about allergen immunotherapy is not described very often in the news media; it is usually only communicated by the science community. The scientific community describes allergen immunotherapy as a scientific solution that helps not only patients with allergies but also positively impacts the quality of life of them and others around them. As temperatures increase due to changing climates, pollen levels also increase. Allergies are becoming a more common problem among the public, which is why the science community advocates for allergen immunotherapy. Subcutaneous allergen immunotherapy, according to the scientific community, is an effective solution to allergies due to numerous positive studies.

Research

Oral immunotherapy
, oral immunotherapy's balance of risk to benefit for food allergies was not well studied. , OIT was under investigation as a treatment for a variety of common food allergies including peanuts, milk, and eggs. Studies involving OIT have shown desensitization towards the allergen. However, there are still questions about longevity of tolerance after the study has ended. However, almost every study has excluded people with severe allergen-induced anaphylaxis.

One approach being studied is in altering the protein structure of the allergen to decrease immune response but still induce tolerance. Extensive heating of some foods can change the conformation of epitopes recognized by IgE antibodies. In fact, studies show that regular consumption of heated food allergens can speed up allergy resolution. In one study, subjects allergic to milk were 16x more likely to develop complete milk tolerance compared to complete milk avoidance. Another approach regarding changes in protein is to change specific amino acids in the protein to decrease recognition of the allergen by allergen-specific antibodies.

Another approach to improving oral immunotherapy is to change the immune environment to prevent TH2 cells from responding to the allergens during treatment. For example, drugs that inhibit IgE-mediated signaling pathways can be used in addition to OIT to reduce immune response. In 1 trial, the monoclonal antibody omalizumab was combined with high-dose milk oral immunotherapy and saw positive results. Several other trials are also currently being done combining omalizumab with OIT for a variety of food allergens. FAHF-2, a Chinese herbal mixture, has shown positive effects on the immune system and has been shown to protect mice from peanut-induced anaphylaxis. FAHF-2 was also well tolerated in a phase I study. While it is possible that omalizumab, FAHF-2 or other immunomodulatory agents alone might be able to treat dangerous allergies, combining these with OIT may be more effective and synergistic, warranting further investigation.

In addition, various adjuvants (nanoparticles) is a field of development that can be used for OIT. With the potential to modulate antigen release, it may one day be possible to take a pill containing nanoparticles that will modulate dosing, requiring fewer office visits.

Studies have also been done to determine the efficacy of OIT for multiple allergens simultaneously. One study concluded that multi-OIT would be possible and relatively, though larger studies would be necessary.

References

External links 
 "American Academy of Allergy, Asthma, and Immunology" information and articles of interest.
 "American College of Allergy, Asthma, and Immunology" information and articles of interest.
 "American Board of Allergy and Immunology" American Board of Allergy and Immunology
 "Allergy shots, allergy immunotherapy" FAQs on Allergy Immunotherapy.

Allergology
Immunotherapy